Phthona is a genus of biting flies in the family of louse flies, Hippoboscidae. There are 3 known species. All are parasite of falconets of the genus Microhierax.

Distribution
All species are found in South East Asia.

Hosts
They found on birds of the genus Microhierax - species: collared falconet (M. caerulescens), Philippine falconet (M. erythrogenys) and the pied falconet (M. melanoleucus)

Systematics
Genus Phthona Maa, 1969
P. leptoptera (Maa, 1963)
P. modesta (Maa, 1963)
P. nigrita (Speiser, 1905)

References

Parasites of birds
Hippoboscidae
Hippoboscoidea genera